The 2021 US Open Women's Singles final was the championship tennis match of the women's singles tournament at the 2021 US Open, contested by two unseeded players, qualifier Emma Raducanu and 73rd-ranked Leylah Fernandez. The match was notable due to it being the first time that a qualifier had ever advanced beyond the semi-final of a grand slam, the first all-teenage women's singles final since the 1999 US Open and the first finalists to be born in the 21st century. Fernandez had defeated four players within the WTA top 10 to reach the final; Naomi Osaka, Angelique Kerber, Elina Svitolina, and Aryna Sabalenka. Meanwhile, Raducanu beat two seeds, eleventh seed and Tokyo 2020 gold medallist Belinda Bencic, and seventeenth seed Maria Sakkari, and had advanced through all her matches, including qualifiers, without dropping a set.

Background
Neither Raducanu nor Fernandez had met on the professional tour, however, Raducanu had beat Fernandez at the 2018 Wimbledon girls' singles. The two met in the second round, with Raducanu beating Fernandez 6-2 6-4. Raducanu went on to lose to Iga Świątek in the quarterfinals. The US Open was both their best record in a grand slam tournament. Before the US Open, Fernandez's best result was at the 2020 French Open, where she defeated thirty-first seed Magda Linette and Polona Hercog before losing to Petra Kvitová in straight sets, reaching the third round. Earlier in the season, Fernandez had won her first WTA Tour title at the 2021 Monterrey Open. She had entered the US Open ranked 73. Fernandez began her tournament by beating both Ana Konjuh and Kaia Kanepi in straight sets. She then went on to beat third seed and defending champion Naomi Osaka, 16th seed Angelique Kerber, 5th seed Elina Svitolina, and second seed Aryna Sabalenka, all in three sets. 

2021 was Raducanu's first season on the WTA Tour, having lost her first WTA-level match at the 2021 Nottingham Open against Harriet Dart. She had won three ITF titles between May 2018 and December 2019. Raducanu's best grand slam result prior to the US Open was at the 2021 Wimbledon Championships, her grand slam debut. Entering as a wildcard, Raducanu reached the fourth round by beating Vitalia Diatchenko, Markéta Vondroušová, and Sorana Cîrstea, before retiring in the second set against Ajla Tomljanović. She entered the US Open ranked 150. Raducanu was seeded 31st in the qualifying rounds, and beat Bibiane Schoofs, Mariam Bolkvadze, and 4th seed Mayar Sherif. Initially scheduled to play 13th seed Jennifer Brady in the first round, before Brady withdrew, Raducanu met Stefanie Vögele and beat her in straight sets. She went on to win matches against Zhang Shuai, Sara Sorribes Tormo and Shelby Rogers before beating 11th seed Belinda Bencic in the quarterfinals and 17th seed Maria Sakkari in the semifinals. Raducanu's straight-set wins had made her the favourite for winning the US Open. At the start of the tournament, betting odds for Raducanu were 400/1, implying a 0.2% chance of success.

Match 

The match began at 4.22 pm and lasted 1 hour and 51 minutes, ending at 6.13 pm. With the result, Raducanu became the new British world number one, surpassing Johanna Konta and entered the world's top 30 for the first time in her career. Fernandez moved up 45 places into the new career high of world number 28.

Impact 
In the United Kingdom, the match was watched by an estimated 9.2 million people. Amazon Prime Video held exclusive broadcast rights to the US Open in the UK, however, a last-minute deal enabled Channel 4 to simultaneously broadcast the match on free-to-air television. According to ESPN, the match attracted a bigger audience in the United States than the men's final, with an estimated 2.44 million viewers compared to 2.05 million for the men's match.

In winning the US Open, Raducanu became the first qualifier in the open era to have ever won a grand slam, in both the men's and women's tours. She was also the first British woman to win a grand slam since Virginia Wade's win against Betty Stöve at the 1977 Wimbledon Championships. Wade had herself won the US Open in 1968, against Billie Jean King. Raducanu had become the second active British player to have a major title, along with Andy Murray, who won his third grand slam at the 2016 Wimbledon Championships. Raducanu became a popular figure in the UK, having already received a large amount of attention for her Wimbledon run. She received congratulatory messages from notable figures including Queen Elizabeth II, Catherine, Princess of Wales, and Prime Minister Boris Johnson. Raducanu also received an MBE owing to her win in the 2022 New Year Honours, and was received by Charles III in November 2022. The win had been used as a catalyst for the government to provide more funding to tennis in the UK, with culture secretary Nadine Dorries promising £30 million in funding a few weeks after her win, in order to improve the quality of and access to tennis courts and coaching across the country. 

Fernandez had also received a significant amount of attention, particularly for her wins against three top-5 seeds, and the defending champion. She became the third female player and fourth player representing Canada to reach a grand slam final, after Bianca Andreescu's win against Serena Williams at the 2019 US Open, Milos Raonic's loss against Andy Murray at the 2016 Wimbledon Championships, and Eugenie Bouchard's loss against Petra Kvitová at the 2014 Wimbledon Championships. Additionally Fernandez and Raducanu, who emigrated to Great Britain when she was 2, became the sixth and seventh Canadian-born players to play a grand slam final, including Greg Rusedski, who represented Great Britain at the 1997 US Open and Mary Pierce, who represented France in several grand slam finals. Fernandez was congratulated by Canadian Prime Minister Justin Trudeau, and was also congratulated by Elizabeth II.

Statistics

References

External links 

2021 US Open (tennis)
September 2021 sports events in the United States
2021